Emanuel Aromaa (27 February 1873 - 14 January 1933; surname until 1894 Sylgren) was a Finnish shoemaker and politician, born in Teisko. He was a member of the Parliament of Finland from 1907 to 1918, from 1924 to 1927 and from 1929 until his death in 1933, representing the Social Democratic Party of Finland (SDP). He was imprisoned in 1918 for having sided with the Reds during the Finnish Civil War.

References

1873 births
1933 deaths
Politicians from Tampere
People from Häme Province (Grand Duchy of Finland)
Social Democratic Party of Finland politicians
Members of the Parliament of Finland (1907–08)
Members of the Parliament of Finland (1908–09)
Members of the Parliament of Finland (1909–10)
Members of the Parliament of Finland (1910–11)
Members of the Parliament of Finland (1911–13)
Members of the Parliament of Finland (1913–16)
Members of the Parliament of Finland (1916–17)
Members of the Parliament of Finland (1917–19)
Members of the Parliament of Finland (1924–27)
Members of the Parliament of Finland (1929–30)
Members of the Parliament of Finland (1930–33)
Shoemakers
People of the Finnish Civil War (Red side)
Prisoners and detainees of Finland